"Ginger Bloke" is a character, played by Danny Morgan, who appears during Zane Lowe's Gonzo on MTV2 where he "interviews" well known musical acts. However, these interviews are edited together using previously recorded interview footage and are made for humorous effect. He usually mocks the artists in some way, and they appear to react comically to his comments and actions.

Bands, artists and celebrities that Ginger Bloke has met include:
 50 Cent
 Kelly Osbourne
 The Killers
 Geri Halliwell
 Red Hot Chili Peppers
 Metallica
 Thom Yorke
 My Chemical Romance
 Girls Aloud
 Jodie Marsh
 Daniel Powter
 Lee Ryan
 Razorlight
 Avril Lavigne

Sample of style
Red Hot Chili Peppers
Ginger Bloke: Right, now, I've got some research here, that I did about you guys and it says here that your career is fucking up. Don't get me wrong, I understand you're still very popular and a lot of morons buy your albums, but all I'm saying is that your music is going steadily and gradually more shitty.
Flea: That's how I feel.
Ginger Bloke: Good, good Gollum! Good.
Flea: I feel that's what happening with us, I know that's what happening with us.

Ginger Bloke: (pointing at Chad) Is he alright? the giant? is he okay?
Antony swirls his finger near his temple
Ginger Bloke: Oh, right, I see, good. Anyway, back to what I was saying, let's take this out. Why do people continue to buy your crappy albums, I mean what's your secret?
Flea: It's magic. (Ginger Bloke smiles stupidly). I hate to say it. It's magic. sings It's magic, you know!
Chad stirs again, lifting up his head
Ginger Bloke: Ooh, BFG's awake again, you're right. Yeah, I don't like him, I preferred him when he was asleep. Kev, can you turn him off please, he's boring me.
Kev: OK. He was turned off.
Kev walks in and puts his hand near Chad's leg, we hear a whirring sound
Ginger Bloke: Yeah, thanks.

External links
 Official website

MTV
Television characters